Island Coast High School is located in Cape Coral, Florida. It is one of four high schools in the city of Cape Coral and is also a part of the Lee County School District. Total enrollment is 1,615 students as of July 2018. It is the newest high school in Cape Coral.

Academics
The College Board's EQ project reports that in order to do effective work in college, it is essential that all students master the following Academic Competencies:
 Reading
 Writing
 Speaking and listening
 Mathematics
 Reasoning
 Computer competency
The school also offers free tutoring to students in several subjects.

Majors

 AA Degree
 Foreign Languages (American Sign Language, French, German, Spanish)
 Advanced Placement Major
 Language Arts
 Agriscience and Natural Resources Education
 Mathematics
 Arts - Visual Arts
 Multimedia
 Athletic Training
 Music
 Business Technology Education
 Physical Education
 Coach Training
 Pre-Law
 College Preparatory/Humanities Concentration
 ROTC and Leadership Training Science
 College Preparatory/Science Concentration
 Science
 Digital Design
 Social Studies
 Drama - Theatre Arts
 Sports Medicine
 English and Journalism
 Television Production
 Environmental Science
 Workforce Readiness (ESE)
 Environmental Studies
 Fine Arts

Sports
In their first year of varsity football, the Island Coast football team won the district title and hosted its first play-off game.  The team ultimately lost 28–0, yet most of the team returns to build on the previous year's success.  The boys varsity baseball team won its district in it first varsity year (2010).  The Island Coast football team, in its 2nd varsity year (2010), came within one game of the 2B state championship. In 2022, the Island Coast baseball team won the state championship, 8-7, against Jensen Beach.

Campus
Actual construction began in mid-April, 2007. The school was completed in
mid-June, 2008. Total costs were at about $63-million. There are 3 floors but the school was designed to allow an additional two floors to be built on top. The school has a capacity of about 2,000 students.

Notable alumni
Aaron Lynch- Defensive End for the National Football League 
Kurt Benkert- Quarterback for the Green Bay Packers
Kory Curtis- Quarterback Ohio State, Bryant University NCAA
Zequandre White- Running Back Miami Dolphins Miami Dolphins

References

External links
Island Coast High School web page

High schools in Lee County, Florida
Public high schools in Florida
Cape Coral, Florida
Educational institutions established in 2007
2007 establishments in Florida